The Society for Research into Higher Education (SRHE) is a UK-based international learned society concerned to advance understanding of higher education, especially through the insights, perspectives and knowledge offered by systematic research and scholarship. The Society aims to be the leading international society in the field, as to both the support and the dissemination of research.

More fully, its broad aims are to:

Stimulate new forms of research and inquiry into higher education as a field of study
Assist in developing research capacity in relation to the field
Encourage and support those coming into the field of higher education studies
Develop a network of scholars and researchers in the field of higher education studies
Offer fora for the presentation of research and scholarship in the field
Promote the development and widening of research methodologies in the field
Provide opportunities for the publication of research and scholarship in the field
Develop opportunities through which researchers in the field can engage with policy makers, practitioners within higher education and other potential interested parties so that policy and practices may be shaped by research

Membership of the society is open to all those concerned with research into higher education, and practitioners in the field.  

SRHE has specialist 'network' groups, which include:
Academic Practice
Digital University
Employability, Enterprise and Work-based Learning
Higher Education Close-up
Higher Education Policy
International Research and Researchers
Learning, Teaching And Assessment
Newer Researchers
Postgraduate Issues
South West Regional Network
Technical, Professional and Vocational Higher Education
The Student Access and Experience Network

The SRHE publishes four journals:
 Higher Education Quarterly
 Research into Higher Education Abstracts
 Studies in Higher Education
 Policy Reviews in Higher Education
and a book series with Routledge/Taylor & Francis Group.

References

 Society for Research into Higher Education (SRHE) Annual Reports 1965 - 2013
 SRHE Mission statement 2008

External links
Official website
Catalogue of the SRHE archives, held at the Modern Records Centre, University of Warwick
SRHE 2008 Annual Report (containing Mission statement)

Education in the London Borough of Islington
Higher education organisations based in the United Kingdom
Organisations based in the London Borough of Islington